
Kluczbork County is a unit of territorial administration and local government (powiat) in Opole Voivodeship, south-western Poland. It came into being on January 1, 1999, as a result of the Polish local government reforms passed in 1998.

As of 2019 its total population is 65,644, out of which the population of Kluczbork is 23,554, that of Wołczyn is 5,907, that of Byczyna is 3,582, and the rural population is 32,601.

Neighbouring counties
Kluczbork County is bordered by Kępno County and Wieruszów County to the north, Olesno County to the south-east, Opole County to the south, and Namysłów County to the west.

Administrative division
The county is subdivided into four gminas (three urban-rural and one rural). These are listed in the following table, in descending order of population.

References

 
Kluczbork